The Oregon Railway and Navigation Company Bridge is a railroad bridge in Lane County in the U.S. state of Oregon. Added to the National Register of Historic Places in 1980, it formerly carried the tracks of the Southern Pacific Transportation Company over the McKenzie River southeast of Coburg. It has since become a pedestrian and bicycle bridge.

Built in 1887 for the Oregon Railway and Navigation Company by George S. Morison and installed over the John Day River in north-central Oregon, it was bought by the Southern Pacific in 1907 and moved to the McKenzie River by the American Bridge Company. Made of iron, it replaced a wooden covered bridge constructed at the site in 1891. It replaced the function of Spores Ferry, which began operation a short distance upstream in 1847 and was an important crossing for wagon trains.

Coburg Road crosses the river on a highway bridge next to the railway bridge, and Interstate 5 crosses on a different highway bridge slightly further upstream.

See also
 List of bridges on the National Register of Historic Places in Oregon

References

1887 establishments in Oregon
Bridges completed in 1887
Railroad bridges on the National Register of Historic Places in Oregon
Railroad bridges in Oregon
Pedestrian bridges in Oregon
Bridges in Lane County, Oregon
National Register of Historic Places in Lane County, Oregon
Whipple truss bridges in the United States
Bridges over the McKenzie River (Oregon)